The Approach Gallery is a contemporary art gallery situated above a public house of the same name in Bethnal Green, London.

History
The gallery was founded in 1997 by Jake Miller, along with artists Damien Meade, Ana Genoves and others .  One of the gallery's original objectives was to offer solo exhibitions to London-based artists at the start of their careers - several of whom have gone on to achieve international success. The gallery was soon solely run by Jake Miller as the other original founder members wished to concentrate on their own careers.  Since 1998 the gallery began representing artists and the programme expanded into an international one, working with established artists as well as continuing to exhibit younger emerging artists and curating a lively group show programme.

In April 2006, The Approach opened a second gallery space (The Reliance) above a pub of the same name in Old Street, Shoreditch. Overseen by Approach gallery director Emma Robertson, the programme ran for 1 year and included a number of emerging international artists, premiering in London for the first time.

In November 2007, The Approach opened a short lease West End gallery space in Mortimer Street, Fitzrovia, London W1. From November 2007 – June 2009 The Approach operated a dual programme in the East and the West, The Approach E2 and W1 respectively.

Artists
Artists represented by The Approach include:

 Phillip Allen  (UK)
 Helene Appel  (DE)
 Sara Barker  (UK)
 Sophie Bueno-Boutellier  (FR)
 Stuart Cumberland  (UK)
 Sara Cwynar  (US)
 Peter Davies  (UK)
 Anna Glantz (US)
 Patrick Hill (US)
 Allison Katz (CA)
 Caitlin Keogh  (US)
 Germaine Kruip  (NL)
 Rezi van Lankveld (NL)
 Jack Lavender  (UK)
 Bill Lynch  (US)
 Sandra Mujinga (CD)
 Dave Muller (US)
 Lisa Oppenheim (US)
 Maria Pinińska-Bereś (PL)
 Magali Reus (NL)
 Amanda Ross-Ho (US)
 John Stezaker (UK)
 Evren Tekinoktay  (DK)
 Sara VanDerBeek  (US)
 Sam Windett  (UK)

References

External links 
 
 The Reliance Archive

 

Contemporary art galleries in London
Art galleries established in 1997
1997 establishments in England
Bethnal Green